Charles Stewart III is an American political scientist, currently the Kenan Sahin Distinguished Professor of political science at Massachusetts Institute of Technology and a Fellow of the American Academy of Arts and Sciences.

References

Year of birth missing (living people)
Living people
 MIT School of Humanities, Arts, and Social Sciences faculty
American political scientists
Emory University alumni
Stanford University alumni
Fellows of the American Academy of Arts and Sciences